Chris Hurst may refer to:

Chris Hurst (footballer) (born 1973), English footballer
Christopher Hurst (born 1954), American politician from Washington State
Christopher Hurst (cricketer) (1886–1963), English cricketer
Chris Hurst (Virginia politician) (born 1987), American politician and former TV news anchor from Virginia